Daniel Souček (born 18 July 1998) is a professional Czech football defender currently playing for Jablonec on loan from Dukla Prague. 

He made his league debut in Táborsko's Czech National Football League 1–1 draw at FC Hradec Králové on 28 July 2017. He played for the Czech Republic under-20 national team in the 2017–18 Under 20 Elite League.

References

External links 
 
 Daniel Souček official international statistics
 
 Daniel Souček profile on the SK Slavia Prague official website

Czech footballers
Czech Republic youth international footballers
1998 births
Living people
Czech First League players
Czech National Football League players
Association football defenders
FC Silon Táborsko players
FK Dukla Prague players
FK Jablonec players